Arkansas Highway 15 (AR 15) is the designation for two state highways in Arkansas. The northern segment of  runs from Altheimer north across Interstate 40 to Furlow.

Route description

Union County
AR 15 begins at Louisiana Highway 161 and runs northeast, cutting through South Arkansas country. The highway serves as a southern terminus for Arkansas Highway 355 outside El Dorado, AR 15 lone junction with another state road. AR 15 next meets the four-lane U.S. Route 82 outside El Dorado, where it terminates.

Altheimer to Furlow
The route begins at US 79 Business and runs north, intersecting Arkansas Highway 31 in Sherrill near the Sherrill Methodist Episcopal Church and the Tucker School in Tucker before entering Lonoke County. AR 15 continues due north across U.S. Route 70 (near the historic US Route 70 Union Valley segment) and Interstate 40 (AR 15 being exit 169, Remington Rd.) before ending at AR 89/AR 294 west.

Major intersections

History

Arkansas Highway 15 was one of the original 1926 routes designated by the Arkansas Highway Commission. The modern day routes were connected. AR 15 continued east from El Dorado into Bradley County through Hermitage and Warren. The route continued north into Cleveland County through Pansy and into Jefferson County, where it ran through Pine Bluff and along present-day AR 31 north to Sherrill, where it meets with today's routing.

The original 1926 routing ended at AR 36 in England, and no state highway ran to Furlow.

See also

 List of state highways in Arkansas

References

External links

015
Transportation in Jefferson County, Arkansas
Transportation in Lonoke County, Arkansas
Transportation in Union County, Arkansas